Vitalij Zotov (born March 3, 1997) is a Ukrainian professional basketball player for Budivelnyk Kyiv. He is a 6 ft 2 in (1.88 m) tall point guard.

He is considered one of the most promising young talents of Ukrainian basketball and one of the best international players of his generation.

References

External links
 FIBA Europe
 Vitalij Zotov at basketball.eurobasket.com 

Living people
1997 births
BC Budivelnyk players
BK VEF Rīga players
Medalists at the 2019 Summer Universiade
Point guards
Ukrainian men's basketball players
Universiade medalists in basketball
Universiade silver medalists for Ukraine